Clinchco is a town in Dickenson County, Virginia, United States. The town, formerly known as Moss, was named for both the Clinchfield Railroad and the Clinchfield Coal Corporation. The population was 337 at the 2010 census, down from 424 at the 2000 census. The Clinchco post office was established in 1917.

Geography
Clinchco is located in north-central Dickenson County at  (37.162466, −82.359951). The town is situated in the valley of the McClure River, a northeast-flowing tributary of the Russell Fork, part of the Levisa Fork/Big Sandy River system leading north to the Ohio River. Virginia State Routes 63 and 83 run through the center of town. VA 83 leads northeast (downriver)  to Haysi, while VA 63 follows a ridge route that takes  to reach Haysi. The two highways run south (upriver) together  to Fremont.

Demographics

At the 2000 census there were 424 people, 189 households, and 113 families in the town. The population density was 153.8 people per square mile (59.3/km). There were 226 housing units at an average density of 82.0 per square mile (31.6/km).  The racial makeup of the town was 90.57% White, 8.96% African American, 0.24% from other races, and 0.24% from two or more races. Hispanic or Latino of any race were 1.42%.

Of the 189 households 30.2% had children under the age of 18 living with them, 45.5% were married couples living together, 10.6% had a female householder with no husband present, and 39.7% were non-families. 37.0% of households were one person and 18.0% were one person aged 65 or older. The average household size was 2.24 and the average family size was 3.00.

The age distribution was 23.6% under the age of 18, 7.1% from 18 to 24, 26.9% from 25 to 44, 25.7% from 45 to 64, and 16.7% 65 or older. The median age was 39 years. For every 100 females, there were 86.0 males. For every 100 females age 18 and over, there were 86.2 males.

The median household income was $18,393 and the median family income  was $23,750. Males had a median income of $30,313 versus $19,688 for females. The per capita income for the town was $12,257. About 26.0% of families and 30.1% of the population were below the poverty line, including 40.0% of those under age 18 and 23.6% of those age 65 or over.

Notable people
 Darrell "Shifty" Powers, World War II (D-day) veteran, Company E ("Easy Company"), 506th Parachute Infantry Regiment, U.S. 101st Airborne Division (portrayed in the HBO miniseries Band of Brothers). Powers described his hometown thus:

Climate
The climate in this area is characterized by relatively high temperatures and evenly distributed precipitation throughout the year.  The Köppen Climate System describes the weather as humid subtropical, and uses the abbreviation Cfa.

References

Towns in Dickenson County, Virginia
Towns in Virginia
Coal towns in Virginia